Dr. Thatikonda Rajaiah (born 12 July 1965) is an Indian politician and present MLA for Station Ghanpur assembly constituency representing the Telangana Rashtra Samithi. He joined Telangana Rashtra Samithi on 30 October 2011. He was sworn in as deputy chief minister of Telangana state on 2 June 2014 along with Md. Mohamood Ali deputy chief minister of Telangana (minority cell).  Chief Minister K. Chandrasekhar Rao on 25 January 2015 fired Deputy Chief Minister and Health Minister T. Rajaiah in the wake of adverse reports about his functioning and failure to take preventive measures in controlling swine flu in Telangana.

Dr. Thatikonda Rajaiah was born in Thatikonda, a village located in Janagama District, Station Ghanpur Zone, Telangana state. He was born on March 2, 1958. Rajaiah's parents were Marapaka Venkataya and Lakshmi. He completed his MBBS in 1981 from Warangal Kakatiya Medical College.

Political career
T. Rajaiah won over Kadiyam Srihari in Andhra Pradesh State Assembly Elections 2009 for INC in Station Ghanpur Assembly Constituency. He joined the Telangana Rashtra Samithi party on 30 October 2011 revolting for Telangana state. He won in by-election in 2012 representing the TRS party. He served as the Deputy Chief Minister for the Govt. of Telangana in the Cabinet of Ministers of Sri K Chandra Sekhar Rao (KCR)-led government in Telangana with effect from the Telangana State Formation Day, 2 June 2014.

Controversies
Charges of corruption in the Telangana's medical and health department surfaced and indicated Deputy Chief Minister Thaikonda Rajaiah's involvement or 'tacit ignorance' of illegal actions in the department. While Rajaiah's dismissal appeared to have been on the cards for quite a time since September, 2014 when he promised a Health University for Warangal seemingly without Telangana CM Kalvakuntla Chandrashekar's direction.

Chief minister's political secretary S Subhash Reddy said, "The developments were on expected lines. The matter of corruption charges against a minister is a serious one."

Rajaiah has earned the dubious distinction of being the First Minister in Telangana to be sacked. Allegations of corruption against the health and medical department include irregularities in recruitment of para-medical staff and purchase of ambulance vehicles.

In a last ditch effort to defend himself, Rajaiah had written to the chief minister seeking forgiveness for his omissions and commissions, but to no avail.

On Jan 25, 2015, before Republic Day, Rajaiah was "supposedly" sacked for his behavior. His duties were transferred to a Bindla caste member (non-madiga) member Kadiyam Srihari who is also from Warangal, in order not to lose the Scheduled Caste vote bank. Mr. Srihari was considered the hidden hand behind the Madiga movement for categorisation of Scheduled Castes though he belonged to the Baindla community which is considered lower in strata than Madigas.

January 2015

Speaking to scribes after spending one night at Manchiryal area hospital as a part of his visit to Adilabad district he said there is nothing wrong in hospital staff demanding Rs 100 and Rs 200.

He said one  should not look at them as corrupt people and one should not complain calling the authorities. He said only if someone pesters patients, people can complain about them to RDO or collectors calling them over phone. Rajaiah changed his statements on swine flu deaths. Rajaiah who said five people were killed due to swine flu till yesterday then said there are no deaths due to swine flu.

September 2014

During an event in Warangal, Thatikonda Rajaiah promised a Health University for Warangal seemingly without Telangana CM Kalvakuntla Chandrashekar's direction. Speaking in the same event, CM KCR had rebuked Thatikonda Rajaiah by saying, "ollu daggara pettukuni matladu", which did not go well among the Madiga caste members including Manda Krishna Madiga, leader of the vetti-chakiri oppressed section of the Telangana. It was aired that KCR did not want any of his ministers to make promises, since he wants to take credit for all the schemes and programmes.

In his complaint, Bakka Judson, TPCC secretary, objected to KCR's use of 'ollu daggara pettukuni matladu', loosely translated as 'mind your language' by KCR claiming that it insulted Dr T Rajaiah, a Dalit Christian.

"Deputy chief minister Dr T Rajaiah belongs to SC (madiga) caste. The remark made by CM K Chandrasekhar Rao was in bad taste", Bakka Judson said in his complaint before National Commission for SC.

Madiga community's response
Madiga Reservation Porata Samiti (MRPS) founder president Manda Krishna on Monday lashed out at Telangana Chief Minister K. Chandrasekhar Rao for firing Deputy Chief Minister T. Rajaiah and said it amounted to insulting the community on the whole.
While not exactly spelling out his future course of action, the MRPS leader said he would chalk out an action plan on the ouster of Dr. Rajaiah soon but reiterated that the 'Madigas' would not rest until justice was done. He regretted that Dr. Rajaiah was not even given an opportunity to explain his position. "The way he was denied even an appointment with the Chief Minister and removed solely on the basis of an allegation is mysterious and that is what is insulting," he said.

The fight of the weaker sections has always been for self-esteem alone and the way Dr. Rajaiah was unceremoniously shown the door only holds mirror to the continued oppression of the weaker sections by upper castes, he said, adding that they would take the struggle forward. The Chief Minister owed people an explanation of how and under what circumstances Dr. Rajaiah was removed and the demand for an apology for such a treatment was justified, Mr. Krishna said.

Hospitalized
Rajaiah suffered a heart attack and was admitted in Hyderguda Apollo Hospital, Hyderabad on 27-01-2015. The former Deputy Chief Minister who was fired by Telangana Chief Minister K. Chandrasekhar Rao on Sunday on charges of corruption in the Health Department, was hospitalized on Tuesday evening after complaining of pain in the chest.

References

 

Telangana Rashtra Samithi politicians
Living people
Indian National Congress politicians from Telangana
Andhra Pradesh MLAs 2009–2014
Telangana MLAs 2014–2018
1965 births
Deputy chief ministers of Telangana
Telangana MLAs 2018–2023